Nicolas Esceth-N'Zi (born 24 June 1977) is a former professional footballer who played as a midfielder. Born in France, he played for the Ivory Coast national team.

International career 
On 8 September 2002, Esceth-N'Zi made his international debut for the Ivory Coast national team in a 0–0 draw to South Africa in African Cup of Nations qualification.

Honours 
Gueugnon

 Coupe de la Ligue: 1999–2000

Lorient

 Coupe de France: 2001–02
 Coupe de la Ligue runner-up: 2001–02

References

External links 

 Esceth-N'Zi's website

1977 births
Living people
People from Amboise
Sportspeople from Indre-et-Loire
French footballers
Ivorian footballers
Association football midfielders
French sportspeople of Ivorian descent

Ivory Coast international footballers
US Orléans players
Bourges 18 players
FC Gueugnon players
Stade Malherbe Caen players
FC Lorient players
Montpellier HSC players
Dubai CSC players
ÉFC Fréjus Saint-Raphaël players
SC Draguignan players
Ligue 1 players
Ligue 2 players
Championnat National 3 players
Championnat National 2 players
UAE Pro League players
French expatriate footballers
Ivorian expatriate footballers
Expatriate footballers in the United Arab Emirates
French expatriate sportspeople in the United Arab Emirates
Ivorian expatriate sportspeople in the United Arab Emirates
Footballers from Centre-Val de Loire